The year 1964 in television involved some significant events. Below is a list of television-related events which occurred in that year.

Events
 Most of NBC's programs are now broadcast in color.
 January 1 – The first Top of the Pops airs on BBC Television in the UK.
 January 3 – Footage of The Beatles performing a concert in Bournemouth, England is shown on The Jack Paar Show in the United States.
 January 4 
 TV Tokyo launched in Japan.
 The Hollywood Palace variety series debuts on ABC in the United States, with first guest host Bing Crosby.
 February 9-23 – The Beatles appear on The Ed Sullivan Show in the United States, breaking television ratings records.
 April 20 – BBC2 starts broadcasting in the UK; the existing BBC channel is renamed BBC1.
 April 30 – Television sets manufactured as of this date are required to receive UHF channels.
 May 5 – The documentary film Seven Up! is broadcast on ITV in the UK, showing the lives of fourteen school children. Subsequent films in the series have seen them interviewed every seven years since.
 June 4 - Sylvania in the United States unveils a revolutionary color TV picture tube in which europium-bearing phosphor allows a much brighter display.
 June 6 – The Rolling Stones make their American TV debut on The Hollywood Palace, hosted by Dean Martin.
 July – The British Associated Television's series Emergency – Ward 10 shows one of the first kisses on television between black and white actors, Joan Hooley playing surgeon Louise Mahler and John White playing Dr. Giles Farmer.
 August 1 – The official launch of Melbourne's third commercial television station ATV-0, signaling the beginning of what is now Network Ten.
 September 7 – "Daisy" advertisement airs on network television in the United States as part of Lyndon B. Johnson 1964 presidential campaign.
 September 17 – The new sitcom Bewitched pilot airs on ABC in the United States starring Elizabeth Montgomery, Dick York and Agnes Moorehead.
 October 10 – NBC in the United States airs the 1964 Summer Olympics opening ceremony at Tokyo, Japan, with first time of live Olympic telecast program by geostationary communication satellite Syncom 3. This telecast marks NBC's first Olympic broadcasting stint.
 October 18 – Jackie Mason appears on The Ed Sullivan Show on CBS in the United States and is subsequently banned after he seemingly gives Ed "the finger" on the air.
 October 25 – The Rolling Stones make their first appearance on The Ed Sullivan Show; the next day, Sullivan insists that he'll never have them back.
 November 26 – Pakistan Television Corporation airs the first television broadcasts in Pakistan.
 December 6 – NBC in the United States debuts the Christmas special Rudolph the Red-Nosed Reindeer. It will become a holiday tradition, moving to CBS in 1972.

Programs/programmes
 American Bandstand (1952–1989)
 Armchair Theatre (UK) (1956–1968)
 As the World Turns (1956–2010)
 Ben Casey (1961–1966)
 Blue Peter (UK) (1958–present)
 Bonanza (1959–1973)
 Bozo the Clown (1949–present)
 Candid Camera (1948–2004)
 Captain Kangaroo (1955–1984)
 Combat! (1962–1967)
 Come Dancing (UK) (1949–1995)
 Coronation Street, UK (1960–present)
 Death Valley Days (1952–1975)
 Dixon of Dock Green (UK) (1955–1976)
 Doctor Who, UK (1963–1989, 1996, 2005–present)
 Face the Nation (1954–present)
 Four Corners, Australia (1961–present)
 General Hospital (1963–present)
 Grandstand (UK) (1958–2007)
 Gunsmoke (1955–1975)
 Hallmark Hall of Fame (1951–present)
 Hockey Night in Canada (1952–present)
 It's Academic (1961–present)
 Juke Box Jury (1959–1967, 1979, 1989–1990)
 Love of Life (1951–1980)
 Match Game (1962–1969, 1973–1984, 1990–1991, 1998–1999)
 Meet the Press (1947–present)
 Mister Ed (1961–1966)
 Mutual of Omaha's Wild Kingdom (1963–1988, 2002–present)
 My Three Sons (1960–1972)
 Opportunity Knocks (UK) (1956–1978)
 Panorama (UK) (1953–present)
 Petticoat Junction (1963–1970)
 Ready Steady Go! (1963–1966)
 Search for Tomorrow (1951–1986)
 The Adventures of Ozzie and Harriet (1952–1966)
 The Andy Griffith Show (1960–1968)
 The Avengers, UK (1961–1969)
 The Bell Telephone Hour (1959–1968)
 The Beverly Hillbillies (1962–1971)
 The Dick Van Dyke Show (1961–1966)
 The Doctors (1963–1982)
 The Donna Reed Show (1958–1966)
 The Ed Sullivan Show (1948–1971)
 The Edge of Night (1956–1984)
 The Flintstones (1960–1966)
 The Fulton Sheen Program (1961–1968)
 The Fugitive (1963–67)
 The Good Old Days (UK) (1953–1983)
 The Guiding Light (1952–2009)
 The Hollywood Palace (1964-1970)
 The Jack Benny Program (1950–1965)
 The Late Late Show, Ireland (1962–present)
 The Lawrence Welk Show (1955–1982)
 The Lucy Show (1962–1968)
 The Mike Douglas Show (1961–1981)
 The Milton Berle Show (1954–1967)
 The Patty Duke Show (1963–1966)
 The Price Is Right (1956–1965)
 The Saint, UK (1962–1969)
 The Secret Storm (1954–1974)
 The Sky at Night (UK) (1957–present)
 The Today Show (1952–present)
 The Tonight Show (1954–present)
 The Tonight Show Starring Johnny Carson (1962–1992)
 This Is Your Life (UK) (1955–2003)
 Truth or Consequences (1950–1988)
 Walt Disney's Wonderful World of Color (1961–69 with this title)
 What the Papers Say (UK) (1956–2008)
 What's My Line (1950–1967)
 Wide World of Sports (1961–1997)
 Z-Cars, UK (1962–1978)

Debuts
 January 1 – Top of the Pops on BBC television (1964–2006)
 January 4 – The Hollywood Palace on ABC (1964–1970)
 January 10 – That Was The Week That Was (TW3) on NBC-TV as a half-hour satirical revue broadcast live from New York after a successful hour-long special on November 10, 1963. The show, based on the BBC program of the same name, ran through May 4, 1965. It was revived as a one-time ABC special in 1985, and as a segment on ABC's Primetime Live ca. 2004–05.
 January 14 – The Magilla Gorilla Show in syndication (1964–67)
 March 30 – The game show Jeopardy! on NBC daytime TV (1964–75, 1978–79, 1984–)
 May 4 – The American soap opera Another World on NBC at 3:00 p.m. ET, as a half-hour show (1964–99)
 September 14 – Voyage to the Bottom of the Sea on ABC (1964–1968)
 September 15 – Peyton Place on ABC (1964–1969)
 September 16 – Shindig! on ABC (1964–1966) and The Peter Potamus Show on Syndication  (1964-65)
 September 17 – Bewitched on ABC (1964–1972)
 September 18 
The Addams Family on ABC (1964–1966)
Jonny Quest on ABC (1964–1965)
 September 19
Flipper on NBC (1964–1967)
Kentucky Jones on NBC (1964–1965)
 September 22 – The Man from U.N.C.L.E. on NBC (1964–1968)
 September 23 – The Cara Williams Show on CBS (1964–1965)
 September 24 
Daniel Boone on NBC (1964–1970)
The Munsters on CBS (1964–1966)
 September 25 – Gomer Pyle, U.S.M.C. on CBS (1964–1969)
 September 26 – Gilligan's Island on CBS (1964–1967)
 October 3 – 
 The Sullavan Brothers on ITV (1964–1965)
 Underdog on NBC (1964–1967)
 October 4 – This Hour Has Seven Days on CBC (1964–66)
 October 5 
 90 Bristol Court on NBC (1964–1965)
 Harris Against the World on NBC (1964–1965)
 Karen on NBC (1964–1965)
 Tom, Dick and Mary on NBC (1964–1965)
 October 13 – Danger Man returns to ITV after being cancelled  in 1961; It would later air on CBS as Secret Agent (1960–61, 1964–66)
 October 28 – The Wednesday Play on BBC1 (1964–1970)
 November 2 – Crossroads on ITV (1964–1988, 2001–2003)
 November 9 - The Les Crane Show, later renamed ABC's Nightlife, on ABC (1964-1965) 
 The Mavis Bramston Show on ATN-7 in Australia (1964–1968)
 Spokoynoy nochi, malyshi! (Спокойной ночи, малыши!, "Good Night, Little Ones!") in the Soviet Union (1964–present)
 The Porky Pig Show on ABC (1964-67)

Ending this year

Births

Deaths

See also
 1964–65 United States network television schedule

References